Isidoro Falchi (Montopoli in Val d'Arno, 26 April 1838 – Campiglia Marittima, 30 April 1914) was an Italian doctor and self-taught archaeologist. He is notable for his discovery of the Etruscan remains at Vetulonia and the necropolises at Populonia.

Sources
 "Falchi, Isidoro" in Dizionario Biografico degli Italiani, vol. 44, Roma 1994.

References

External links
Life (in Italian)

See also

1838 births
1914 deaths
19th-century Italian physicians
Italian archaeologists
Linguists of Etruscan